Sarah Coral Hanson-Young (née Hanson; born 23 December 1981) is an Australian politician who has been a Senator for South Australia since July 2008, representing the Australian Greens. She is a graduate of the WEF young global leaders program. She is the youngest woman to be elected to federal parliament, winning election at the age of 25 and taking office at the age of 26. She was the youngest person ever elected to the Senate (although several others have been appointed at younger ages), until Jordon Steele-John was elected in 2017.

Early life and education
Hanson-Young was born in Melbourne, and grew up near Orbost in East Gippsland. In 1999 she was awarded the Australia Day Young Citizen of the Year award for Gippsland, Victoria.

She graduated from the University of Adelaide with a Bachelor of Social Sciences in 2002. While studying, she was Environment Officer from 2001 to 2002, and then President from 2002 to 2003, of the Students' Association of the University of Adelaide.

Career
In 2004, Hanson-Young worked as a bank teller. From 2004, until she took parliamentary office in 2008, she worked for Amnesty International as Campaign Manager for South Australia and the Northern Territory.

In 2006, she was studying for a postgraduate law degree.

Prior to her entry into politics, she also worked as media advisor to Mark Parnell (SA Greens) in the 2006 South Australian election and was a campaigner with Justice for Refugees (SA).

Political career

Hanson-Young was a candidate for the South Australian Legislative Council in the 2006 state election, ranked fourth on the Greens' ticket.

Hanson-Young was elected senator for South Australia at the 2007 federal election. She was the first Greens senator to be elected in that state, the youngest person—at 25—ever popularly elected to the Australian senate, and the youngest woman ever elected to the Australian parliament (Natasha Stott Despoja was younger at her first sitting, but older at the time of her election). Although the South Australian Green primary vote remained relatively unchanged, preferences from the Australian Labor Party provided the required quota for a Greens senator.

Hanson-Young became the focus of attention on 18 June 2009, when the Senate President ordered the removal of her two-year-old daughter from the Senate chamber during a division. The rules of parliament at the time did not allow for senators or members to bring their children into the chamber. Public reaction on the matter was divided, and ignited a debate on accommodating children and their careers in the workplace. Despite a delay of seven years, the incident led directly to a change in the rules of both the House of Representatives and Senate, which now allow MPs and senators to care for their children for short periods in the chamber.

Hanson-Young challenged Christine Milne for the Green deputy leadership in October 2010, but she was unsuccessful. Hanson-Young was critical of the Greens supporting the minority Labor Gillard Government, and wanted the party to negotiate with the Liberal Party. However, plans for these negotiations were stopped by Milne.

Following the resignation of Australian Greens leader Bob Brown in 2012, she was again nominated for the deputy leadership but lost by an undisclosed margin to Adam Bandt.
Hanson-Young was re-elected to the Senate at the 2013 federal election and again at the 2016 double dissolution election.

In December 2013, Hanson-Young, along with Senators Louise Pratt (ALP) and Sue Boyce (LNP) established a cross-party working group on marriage equality.

In August 2016, Hanson-Young was replaced as the Greens' Immigration spokesperson by Nick McKim. She retained the senior portfolio areas of education and finance.

Hanson-Young won a further six-year senate term in the 2019 federal election, with her party receiving 10.9% of first preference votes, as well as a 5.03-point swing in her favour.

As of 2021, Hanson-Young acts as the spokesperson for the following:
 Arts, Media & Communications
 Tourism
 Transport and Infrastructure
 Environment & Water
 Gambling

Defamation case 
In July 2018, Senator David Leyonhjelm suggested Hanson-Young should "stop shagging men", during a parliamentary debate on women's safety, in response to a parliamentary interjection by Hanson-Young which Leyonhjelm interpreted as her labelling "all men being rapists".  Hanson-Young has described the idea of all men being rapists as "absurd". In response to Leyonhjelm's interjection, Hanson-Young called Leyonhjelm a "creep" before he told her to "fuck off". Hanson-Young called for Leyonhjelm to resign after Leyonhjelm refused to apologise and commenced crowd fundraising to pay for legal proceedings to sue him for defamation, claiming that any damages awarded would be donated to charity. On 14 August 2018, the Greens moved a motion in the Senate to censure Leyonhjelm for his remarks against Hanson-Young which passed 30–28. In the defamation court case, Derryn Hinch has given evidence that Hanson-Young had said "women would not need protection" (in the forms proposed by the bill) "if men stopped raping women", and that this did not mean all men raped women. In 2019, Court Justice Richard White ruled in favour of Hanson-Young, awarding her $120,000 in damages.

Published works

Personal life
Hanson-Young was married to former local government councillor Zane Young; the couple divorced in 2011. They have one child.

In April 2022, she married the director of progressive think-tank The Australia Institute, Ben Oquist.

References

External links

 Sarah Hanson-Young official website
 
 
 
 Parliamentary biography
 SA Greens website
 Introductory interview on Triple J's Hack programme 18 August 2008 (audio mp3 format)
 Summary of parliamentary voting for Senator Sarah Hanson-Young on TheyVoteForYou.org.au

1981 births
Living people
Australian Greens members of the Parliament of Australia
Australian republicans
Australian LGBT rights activists
Members of the Australian Senate
Members of the Australian Senate for South Australia
Politicians from Adelaide
People from Orbost
Politicians from Melbourne
Women members of the Australian Senate
University of Adelaide alumni
21st-century Australian politicians
21st-century Australian women politicians